Eduard Volodymyrovych Shifrin (alternative spelling: Shyfrin) (born 12 July 1960) is a Ukrainian entrepreneur who is a co-owner of the Midland Group. He is a resident in London.

Biography

Early life and education
Shifrin was born in Dnipropetrovsk, Soviet Ukraine, the son of metallurgy professor  Vladimir Moiseyevich Shifrin. In 1976–7 he came first in the National Ukrainian Physics Olympiad. From 1977–1983, he attended the Moscow Institute of Steel and Alloys, becoming a metallurgical engineer. He later returned to school and obtained a PhD in metallurgy in 1992.

Business career 
From 1983 to 1993, Shifrin worked in Zaporizhia at the steel company Dniprospecstal, rising from assistant foreman to manager of the steel plant and then head of marketing.  He then rose to prominence as a business oligarch in newly independent Ukraine, taking control of privatized steelmaker Zaporizhstal. He co-founded, with Alexander Shnaider, Midland Group, a holding company headquartered in Guernsey that embraces interests in steel (including Zaporizhstal, Ukraine's fourth largest steel mill), shipping, real estate, agriculture and sports. Together they own a share in The St. Regis Toronto and formerly owned Maccabi Tel Aviv and a Formula One team, Midland F1 Racing.

In the 2006 edition of the Sunday Times Rich List, Shifrin was listed at no. 59 with an estimated wealth of £920 million. In Forbes magazine's ranking of "The World's Billionaires" in 2009, Shifrin was ranked 559th with an estimated fortune of $1.3 billion. In 2013, Focus magazine estimated his net worth at $893.3 million, making him the No. 20 richest person in Ukraine.

Writing career 
In 2006, together with his late father, Shifrin published a book titled The Theory of Metallurgical Processes for which he was awarded the State Prize of Ukraine.

In 2018 Shifrin's book From Infinity to Man: The Fundamental Ideas of Kabbalah Within the Framework of Information Theory and Quantum Physics was published in Russian, with an English edition being released in 2019. 

In 2019, his children's book Travels with Sushi in the Land of the Mind was published in English. In 2020 it was named a Distinguished Favorite by the Independent Press Award for Juvenile Fiction.

He is a sponsor of Jewish Book Week.

He regularly writes articles about the Kabbalah of Information for the Jerusalem Post.

Philanthropy 
In 2003 he financed the reconstruction of the oldest synagogue in Kyiv and Jewish educational center dedicated to his late father. He also co-sponsored the construction of synagogues in Moscow, Volgograd, and Zaporozhye. He sponsors over 60 Chabad educational classes for children. He served as regional vice-president of the World Jewish Congress.

Personal life
Shifrin and his wife live in London with their three children.

References

External links
 Midland Group website 
 Zaporizhstal website
 Forbes World's Richest People - Eduard Shifrin
 Eduard Shifrin, World Jewish Congress Vice-President
 Travels With Sushi website

1960 births
Living people
Businesspeople from Dnipro
Ukrainian billionaires
Ukrainian Jews
National University of Science and Technology MISiS alumni
Ukrainian oligarchs
Zaporizhstal
Formula One team owners
Ukrainian businesspeople in the United Kingdom
Kabbalah
Laureates of the State Prize of Ukraine in Science and Technology